Foamy in an adjective that describes a foam-like texture.
Foamy may also refer to:
 Foamy the squirrel, a character in the webtoon, Neurotically Yours
 Foamy the Freakadog, a briefly appearing sidekick to the eponymous superhero on the Freakazoid! television show

See also
 Foam (disambiguation)